Gillian Anne Gehring  (born Gillian Anne Murray, 19 May 1941) is a British academic physicist, and emeritus Professor of Physics in the Department of Physics and Astronomy at the University of Sheffield. She was the second woman in the UK to become a Professor of Physics and in 2009 won the Nevill Mott Medal and Prize.

Early life and education
Gehring was born in Nottingham, where she attended school. She studied Physics at the Victoria University of Manchester from 1959 to 1962 and from 1962 to 1963 she studied for the Diploma in Advanced Studies. From 1963 to 1965, she studied for a DPhil in Theoretical Physics at the University of Oxford.

Career and research
From 1965 to 1968, Gehring was a Leverhulme Fellow at St Hugh's College, Oxford, and then a NATO fellow at the University of California at Berkeley. From 1968 to 1989, Gehring was a lecturer in the Department of Theoretical Physics and a Tutorial Fellow at St Hugh's College, Oxford. From 1989 to 2006, Gehring was Professor of Solid-State Physics at the University of Sheffield and was the only female professor in the Physics department.

Gehring's research field is theoretical and experimental magnetism, and she has made major contributions to research projects concerned with orbital ordering and the co-operative Jahn-Teller effect.

Gehring has an interest in women in science. She sat on the Administrative Board of the European Platform for Women in Science, served on the Institute of Physics’ Women in Physics Group, and chaired the Women’s Group of the European Physical Society.

Awards and honours 

 2009 — Institute of Physics Nevill Mott Medal and Prize
 2005 — OBE, 2005 Birthday Honours, for services to Physics and to Equal Opportunities.

Personal life
In 1968, she married Karl Gehring. She had two daughters in 1979 and 1981.

Publications 

 Sharma, P., A. Gupta, K. V. Rao, F. J. Owens, R. Sharma, R. Ahuja, J. M. Osorio Guillen, B. Johansson and G. A. Gehring, "Ferromagnetism above room temperature in bulk and transparent thin films of Mn-doped ZnO," Nature Materials 2, 673 (2003). DOI: https://doi.org/10.1038/nmat984
 Gehring, G. A. and K. A. Gehring, "Co-operative Jahn-Teller effects," Rep. Prog. Phys. 38, 1 (1975). DOI: https://doi.org/10.1088/0034-4885/38/1/001
 Behan, A. J., A. Mokhtari, H. J. Blythe, D. Score, X.-H. Xu, J. R. Neal, A. M. Fox, and G. A. Gehring, "Two Magnetic Regimes in Doped ZnO Corresponding to a Dilute Magnetic Semiconductor and a Dilute Magnetic Insulator," Phys. Rev. Lett. 100, 047206 (2008). DOI: https://doi.org/10.1103/PhysRevLett.100.047206

See also
 List of organizations for women in science

References

External links
 University of Sheffield
 

1941 births
Academics of the University of Sheffield
Alumni of the Victoria University of Manchester
English physicists
20th-century British physicists
21st-century British physicists
British women physicists
Fellows of St Hugh's College, Oxford
Fellows of the Institute of Physics
Officers of the Order of the British Empire
People from Nottingham
British physicists
English women physicists
Living people
20th-century English women
20th-century English people
21st-century English women
21st-century English people